During the 1991–92 English football season, Aston Villa competed in the Football League First Division. Ron Atkinson took charge of the team taking over from Josef Venglos.

Aston Villa improved on the previous season's poor 17th-place finish to finish 7th, under new manager Ron Atkinson.  This came despite an horrendous run of form from New Year's Day, which saw them win just one game and score only two goals in twelve league matches.

Villa's new manager made many new signings in the months following his June 1991 arrival at Villa Park, including new goalkeeper Les Sealey, teenage defender Ugo Ehiogu, striker Dalian Atkinson and mid-season signing Earl Barrett.

Top scorer was Trinidadian striker Dwight Yorke, who scored 11 times in the First Division and 17 times in all competitions.

Final league table

Results
Aston Villa's score comes first

Legend

Football League First Division

FA Cup

League Cup

Full Members Cup

Squad

Left club during season

Reserve squad

Transfers

In

Out

Transfers in:  £2,290,000
Transfers out:  £9,140,000
Total spending:  £7,150,000

References

External links
Aston Villa official website
avfchistory.co.uk 1991–92 season

Aston Villa F.C. seasons
Aston Villa